Creative problem-solving (CPS) is the mental process of searching for an original and previously unknown solution to a problem. To qualify, the solution must be novel and reached independently. The creative problem-solving process was originally developed by Alex Osborn and Sid Parnes. Creative problem solving (CPS) is a way of using your creativity to develop new ideas and solutions to problems. The process is based on separating divergent and convergent thinking styles, so that you can focus your mind on creating at the first stage, and then evaluating at the second stage.

Creative solution types 
The process of creative problem-solving usually begins with defining the problem. This may lead to finding a simple non-creative solution, a textbook solution, or discovering prior solutions developed by other individuals. If the discovered solution is sufficient, the process may then be abandoned.

A creative solution will often have distinct characteristics that include using only existing components, or the problematic factor, as the basis for the solution. However, a change of perspective may in many cases be helpful. A solution may also be considered creative if readily available components can be used to solve the problem within a short time limit.

If a creative solution has a broad application, such that the usage goes beyond the original intent, it may be referred to as an innovative solution, or an innovation (some innovations may also be considered an invention).

Techniques and tools 
Many techniques and tools employed for creating effective solutions to a problem are described in creativity techniques and problem-solving articles.

Creative problem-solving technique categories 
 Mental state shift and cognitive re-framing: Changing one's focus away from active problem-solving and towards a creative solution set.
 Multiple idea facilitation: Increasing the quantity of fresh ideas based on the belief that a greater number of ideas will raise the chances that one of these is valuable. This may include randomly selecting an idea (such as choosing a word from a list) and thinking about its similarities to the situation. In turn, this random act may inspire a related idea that would lead to a solution.
 Inducing a change of perspective: Efficiently entering a fresh perspective may result in a solution that thereby becomes obvious. This is especially useful for solving particularly challenging problems. Many techniques to this end involve identifying independent dimensions that differentiate closely associated concepts. Differentiating concepts help overcome a tendency to use oversimplified associative thinking, in which two related concepts are so closely associated that their differences are overlooked.

Idea generation techniques 

 Brainstorming: Brainstorming is an idea generation method invented by Alex Osborn and further developed by Charles Hutchison Clark, Brainstorming aims to encourage the generation of new and unusual ideas in a group of people, Alex Osborn based his development of brainstorming on the Indian technique Prai-Barshana, which has been around for about 400 years, he named brainstorming after the idea of ​​this method, namely “using the brain to storm a problem”.
 Creative Thinking: Coming up with ideas, especially innovative ideas, needs creativity and can be supported by certain creativity techniques. The creativity process is usually applied through a person, product, process, and place. Thus, creativity means that a creative person develops great ideas and novel products through a creative process in a creative environment.
Creativity processes use these influencing factors as they support the search for ideas, problem solving and evaluation, and selection of ideas via rules, a group of people, and a creative process. The workshops are therefore based on creative idea generation techniques that follow individual steps.

 Design thinking: Design thinking is an approach to problem-solving and ideation process that works through four key elements.

 The user as the starting point
 Interdisciplinary team
 Iterative process
 Creative environment.  In the design thinking process, the 'customer's needs are first determined through an iterative process and a question is defined, then creative solutions and ideas are generated through brainstorming and visualized via prototypes for user feedback.

 Complex Opportunity Recognition Techniques: Opportunity Recognition describes the identification of opportunities to generate growth for companies. The different idea generation techniques of opportunity recognition are based either on the market, the company, or the company's environment. In order for this approach to be suitable for young companies, it must fulfill the following attributes:

 Not too resource-intensive
 Suitable for workshops
 High growth potential
 Don't require existing structures or certain age of the company

See also

Related articles 

 Creativity
 Collective problem solving
 Frugal innovation
 Invention
 Lateral thinking
 Problem structuring methods
 Systems thinking
 TRIZ

Related lists 
 List of thought processes
 List of cognitive biases
 List of creative thought processes
 List of decision-making processes
 List of emotional intelligence topics
 List of emerging technologies
 List of counseling topics

References

Further reading 
 Alex Osborn, Applied Imagination: Principles and Procedures of Creative Problem Solving, Creative Education Foundation Press, 1953/2001, 
 Edward de Bono, Lateral Thinking : Creativity Step by Step, Harper & Row, 1973, trade paperback,  300 pages, 
 Altshuller, Henry. 1994. The Art of Inventing (And Suddenly the Inventor Appeared). Translated by Lev Shulyak. Worcester, Massachusetts: Technical Innovation Center.

External links 
 Problematic: the art and craft of Problem Dealingcourseware on problem-finding and problem-solving

Creativity
Creativity techniques
Design
Innovation
Problem solving methods